is a town located in Mie Prefecture, Japan. , the town had an estimated population of 15,409 in 7021 households and a population density of 1800 persons per km².

Geography
Kawagoe is located in northeastern Mie Prefecture, in the lowlands bordering on Ise Bay. Parts of the municipality are polders, at (or near) sealevel.

Neighboring municipalities
Mie Prefecture
Yokkaichi
Asahi
Kuwana

Climate
Kawagoe has a Humid subtropical climate (Köppen Cfa) characterized by warm summers and cool winters with light to no snowfall.  The average annual temperature in Kawagoe is 14.9 °C. The average annual rainfall is 1656 mm with September as the wettest month. The temperatures are highest on average in August, at around 26.6 °C, and lowest in January, at around 3.5 °C.

Demographics
Per Japanese census data, the population of Kawagoe has increased steadily over the past 30 years.

History
The area of present-day Kawagoe was located in ancient Ise Province and was part of the holdings of Kuwana Domain in the Edo period, It was an area of large scale land reclamation projects by the Domain to increase its rice lands. During the Meiji period, Kawagoe was one of the villages established within Asake District of Mie Prefecture with the creation of the modern municipalities system on April 1, 1889. Asake District was abolished in 1896, and merged with Mie District. Kawagoe village was raised to town status on October 17, 1957.

Government
Kawagoe has a mayor-council form of government with a directly elected mayor and a unicameral town council of 12 members. Kawagoe, collectively with the other municipalities of Mie District, contributes two members to the Mie Prefectural Assembly. In terms of national politics, the town is part of Mie 3rd district of the lower house of the Diet of Japan.

Economy
Kawagoe has an economy based on agriculture and Commercial fishing. Chubu Electric's Kawagoe Power Station is located in the town.

Education
Kawagoe has two public elementary schools and one public middle school operated by the town government, and one public high school operated by the Mie Prefectural Board of Education.

Transportation

Railway
 Kintetsu Railway – Nagoya Line

Highway
 Isewangan Expressway

Notable people
Yūta Ishikawaprofessional shogi player 
Kumiko Oguraprofessional badminton player

References

External links

Kawagoe official website 

Towns in Mie Prefecture
Populated coastal places in Japan
Kawagoe, Mie